The Central Bank of Curaçao and Sint Maarten (previously the Bank of the Netherlands Antilles) is the central bank for the Netherlands Antillean guilder and administers the monetary policy of Curaçao and Sint Maarten. The bank dates to 1828 making it the oldest surviving central bank in the Americas.

Prior to the dissolution of the Netherlands Antilles in October 2010, the bank was responsible for monetary policy throughout the Netherlands Antilles. When the BES islands became subject to the central bank of the Netherlands, its present name was adopted.

The bank is expected to replace the Netherlands Antillean guilder with the Caribbean guilder in the coming years.

There has been controversy around CBCS regarding corruption and nepotism.

See also

 Economy of the Netherlands Antilles
 Netherlands Antillean gulden
 De Nederlandsche Bank
 Central Bank of Aruba
 Economy of Curaçao
 Dutch Caribbean Securities Exchange
 Central banks and currencies of the Caribbean

References

External links
Centrale Bank van Curaçao en Sint Maarten official site

Curaçao
Economy of the Netherlands Antilles
Economy of Curaçao
Economy of Sint Maarten
1828 establishments in the Dutch Empire
Banks established in 1828